Harry Joseph Brooks (December 2, 1902 – February 25, 1928) was an American test pilot. His crash of the Ford Flivver for the Stout Metal Airplane Division of the Ford Motor Company in 1928 was cited with the Great Depression as a factor in Henry Ford's exit from the aviation business.

Early life
Brooks grew up in Southfield, Michigan, and became interested in aviation at an early age. At age nine, he saw the Wright brothers and one of their aircraft at a state fair. Brooks began pursuing his interest in aviation, taking flying lessons at a local airstrip, where he was observed on several occasions by Henry Ford. His father played the violin at dances at a local inn and met Ford. The elder Brooks invited Ford home for dinner and introduced him to his son.

Ford hired Harry to work in one of his auto plants. Several months later, Ford gave Harry a job as a test pilot for the Stout Metal Airplane Division of the Ford Motor Company. Although still very young, Brooks soon became Ford’s top pilot, as well as a close friend whom Ford nicknamed "Brooksie". Brooks demonstrated the capabilities of the new monoplane Ford Trimotor to biplane maker, William Boeing by handing him the controls and sitting back in the passenger cabin. For the first night flight of a Ford Trimotor, Brooks flew Charles Lindbergh's mother from Detroit to Cleveland. Brooks was also the pilot that flew Lindbergh's mother to Mexico, alongside the Spirit of St. Louis in their 1927 publicity trips. On February 10, 1927, Brooks flew the first aircraft guided solely by a radio-beacon system.

Ford Flivver
When Ford released the new Ford Flivver in 1926, Brooks used the prototype to fly to his home just north of Ford Airport.

A third prototype, tail number 3218, with "long" wings was built to win a long distance record for light planes in  "C" class.  The race was set from Ford Field in Dearborn Michigan to Miami, Florida. A first attempt launched on January 24, 1928, witnessed by Henry Ford, landed short in Asheville, North Carolina. A second attempt, flying the second prototype, witnessed by Edsel Ford, Brooks launched from Detroit on February 21, 1928, but landed  short in Titusville, Florida, where the propeller was bent, but still achieved a  record.

Brooks attempted a long distance record attempt to fly from Ford Field in Dearborn Michigan to Miami, Florida. A first attempt launched on January 24, 1928, witnessed by Henry Ford, landed short in a forced landing at Asheville, North Carolina. A second attempt, flying the second prototype, witnessed by Edsel Ford, Brooks launched from Detroit on February 21, 1928, but landed  short in Titusville, Florida, where the propeller was bent, but still achieved a record of flying 1,200 miles unrefueled.

During his overnight stay at Titusville, Brooks had repaired the aircraft, using a propeller from the forced landing. He had also placed wooden toothpicks in the vent holes of the fuel cap to prevent moist air from entering and condensing overnight. On February 25, Brooks took off to complete the race, circled out over the Atlantic where his motor quit and he went down off Melbourne, Florida. The wreckage of the Ford Flivver washed up, but Brooks' body was never found.

Investigation of the wreckage disclosed that the matchsticks had plugged the fuel cap vent holes, causing an engine stoppage.

Brooks was slated to be a pilot for Richard Evelyn Byrd's expeditions.

References

Notes

Citations

Bibliography

 Corn, Joseph J. The Winged Gospel: America's Romance with Aviation. Baltimore, Maryland: The Johns Hopkins University Press, 2002. .
 Davis, Michael W. R. and James K. Wagner. Ford Dynasty: A Photographic History. Mount Pleasant, South Carolina: Arcadia Publishing, 2002. .
 Ford, Richardson Bryan. Beyond the Model T: The Other Ventures of Henry Ford (Great Lakes Books Publication). Detroit: Wayne State University Press, 1997. .
 Holden, Henry M. The Fabulous Ford Tri-Motors. Los Angeles, California: Black Hawk Publishing Company, 2011.
 McCarthy, Kevin M. Aviation in Florida. Sarasota, Florida: Pineapple Press, 2003. .
 O'Callaghan, Timothy J. The Aviation Legacy of Henry & Edsel Ford (Michigan). Livonia, Michigan: First Page Publications, 2001. .
 Pauley, Robert F. Michigan Aircraft Manufacturers (Images of Aviation). Mount Pleasant, South Carolina: Arcadia Publishing, 2009. .
 Rodgers, Eugene. Beyond the Barrier: The Story of Byrd's First Expedition to Antarctica. Annapolis, Maryland: Naval Institute Press, 1990. .

External links
 The Planes: 1926 Ford Flivver
 

1902 births
1928 deaths
American aviation record holders
American test pilots
Aviators killed in aviation accidents or incidents in the United States
People from Southfield, Michigan
Victims of aviation accidents or incidents in 1928